Sai Sachdev (born 23 October 2004) is an English professional footballer who plays as a right-back for the English club Sheffield United.

Club career
Sachdev joined the youth academy of Sheffield United in 2021. In October 2022, he was first called up to train with the senior squad of Sheffield United after the club faced an injury crisis. He made his professional and EFL Championship debut as a late substitute with Sheffield United in a 3–1 loss to Stoke City on 8 October 2022.

International career
Born in England, Sachdev is of Indian descent. He is a youth international for England, having been called up to the England U17s and U18s.

References

External links
 

2004 births
Living people
Footballers from Leicester
English footballers
England youth international footballers
English people of Indian descent
British sportspeople of Indian descent
British Asian footballers
Association football fullbacks
Sheffield United F.C. players
English Football League players